The Bricktown Brawlers were a professional indoor football team based in Oklahoma City, Oklahoma. They were a member of the Lonestar Division of the Intense Conference in the Indoor Football League (IFL). The team was founded in 2010 as an expansion member of the IFL. The Brawlers played their home games at Cox Convention Center.

History
On October 25, 2010, it was announced that Jay and Dale Morris had been awarded an expansion franchise in the Indoor Football League. On November 4, 2010, the team announced that Steve Perdue would be their inaugural head coach, as well as a name-the-team contest. On November 22, 2010, it was announced that the franchise would be named the Bricktown Brawlers. On December 16, 2010, the Brawlers announced that former University of Oklahoma quarterback Jason White was added as a co-owner of the team. Assistant coach William McCarthy became the head coach prior to the start of the season.

The Brawlers won their first game on March 13, 2011, with a 29–20 victory over the Amarillo Venom.

After their tenth game of the 2011 season, the Bricktown Brawlers released most of their players and used local semiprofessional teams wearing the Brawlers' uniforms to play the final four games. The Brawlers officially folded at the conclusion of the season and filed for Chapter 7 bankruptcy protection on July 27, 2011.

Statistics

Personnel

Coaches
William McCarthy – head coach
Mike Martinez – assistant
Jahmal Fenner – assistant
Lamar Baker – assistant
Steve Perdue – assistant

Final roster

2011 season

*  = Kickoff Classic Weekend, before week 1 starts.

** = Played by local semi-pro replacement teams in place of the Brawlers

Standings

References

External links 
Bricktown Brawlers official website

American football teams in Oklahoma
Former Indoor Football League teams
Defunct American football teams in Oklahoma
American football teams established in 2010
American football teams disestablished in 2011
2010 establishments in Oklahoma
2011 disestablishments in Oklahoma